Raffles City is a large complex located in the Civic District within the Downtown Core of the city-state of Singapore. Occupying an entire city block bounded by Stamford Road, Beach Road, Bras Basah Road and North Bridge Road, it houses two hotels and an office tower over a podium which contains a shopping complex and a convention centre. The mall is managed by CapitaCommercial Trust and CapitaMall Trust. It was completed in 1986.

Built on the former site of Raffles Institution, the first school in Singapore, and located beside the historic Raffles Hotel, its aluminium-finish and simple geometric designs gave a stark, modernist contrast to Victorian architecture and classical architecture which used to characterise architecture in that district.

The embassy of Hungary is located on the 29th floor of the Raffles City Tower, which also houses the delegation office of the European Union.

History

Initial plans
The development, initially called the Raffles International Centre, was first announced in 1969, planned to cover an area stretching from the then-site of Raffles Institution up to the Cathay Building. However, due to soaring costs and a shortage of skilled workers, the plans were put on hold from 1973 to 1975. However, due to cost issues, approval for construction was not given until 1979. That same year, the development was renamed Raffles City, and the development was shrunken to only the old Raffles Institution site.

Construction
Groundbreaking on the site took place on 14 August 1980 and officially opened to the public on 3 October 1986. The complex was designed by I. M. Pei in one of his earliest works in the city state.

Renovations
In the 1990s the shopping complex went under a major renovation, with a different look. In June 2005, the management announced that the basement section of the complex will be expanded, with 30 to 50 more shops and was completed in July 2006 with MPH Bookstores, food and beverage outlets and fashion shops occupying the extension. Gloria Jean's Coffees has also made a return to the country after exiting the country a few years ago. The complex is directly connected to City Hall MRT (Exit 'A") station by escalators from the building entrance and to Esplanade MRT station (Exit 'G') from Basement 2, which leads to the Esplanade Xchange and then to Marina Square.

Rebranding
Until the hotels' management contract with Starwood Hotels & Resorts expired at the end of 2001, the two hotels in Raffles City were named The Westin Stamford and The Westin Plaza. On 1 January 2002, both hotels were rebranded as the Swissôtel The Stamford and Raffles The Plaza (now Fairmont Singapore) when FRHI Hotels & Resorts took over the hotels' management.

CapitaLand REITs takeover
On 19 March 2006, CapitaLand's real estate investment trust (REIT), CapitaCommercial Trust and CapitaMall Trust jointly acquired the development from Raffles Holdings for S$2.09 billion. The former will take up a 60 percent stake in the complex and the latter taking the remainder 40 percent. The trusts' shareholders approved of the purchase of the complex in July 2006. The deal has been completed in August 2006 and the complex is owned by the two trusts.

Expansion
The two CapitaLand property trusts will spend S$86 million on the expansion. An underground link linking Esplanade and City Hall MRT stations opened on 15 July 2010.

Reconfiguration works
On 20 December 2021, CapitaLand announced the reconfiguration of  located on levels 1 to 3 to attract more specialty shops with new escalators installed to increase accessibility for shoppers, replacing the space currently occupied by department store One Assembly and previously Robinsons & Co., which will shut on 3 January 2022. The reconfiguration will feature new shop concepts and brands as part of an asset enhancement initiative, which will be completed by the fourth quarter of 2022.

Buildings
The complex consists of the one-time world's tallest hotel and currently the world's fourteenth tallest hotel, the 73-storey Swissôtel The Stamford, a 28-storey high-end twin-tower hotel, the Fairmont Singapore and the rectangular 42-storey Raffles City Tower, an office block.

Tenants
Japanese departmental store Sogo opened in 1986 but vacated the space and the basement supermarket (now occupied by CS Fresh) in 2000 after the company ran into financial problems due to 1997 Asian financial crisis. 

Marks & Spencer has opened since 2001 alongside local favorite Robinsons (marking its return to Raffles Place) and Dairy Farm's premium supermarket brand Jason's Market Place (now known as Raffles City Market Place). Both department stores were closed down due to COVID-19 pandemic (Robinsons on 9 January 2021 with Marks & Spencer supposed to close on 31 December 2020, which did not shut eventually)) and replaced with One Assembly, a joint-venture between Raffles City and BHG department store. One Assembly will subsequently shut as well on 3 January 2022. Marks & Spencer eventually announced its closure again, scheduled for 31 December 2021.

Events

117 IOC Session, Singapore

The 117th IOC Session in Singapore, was held from 2 to 9 July 2005 at the Raffles City Convention Centre on the fourth floor. Security at the complex was extremely tight during the event. At the IOC Session, London was awarded the 2012 Summer Olympics.

Gallery

See also
 List of shopping malls in Singapore
 List of tallest buildings in Singapore

References

External links

 

1986 establishments in Singapore
CapitaLand
I. M. Pei buildings